Annika Bochmann (born 16 July 1991) is a German sailor, specializing in the 470 (dinghy) class. She represented Germany, along with partner Marlene Steinherr, in the women's 470 class at the 2016 Summer Olympics in Rio de Janeiro. They finished in 18th place.

References

External links 
 
 
 
 

1991 births
Living people
German female sailors (sport)
Olympic sailors of Germany
Sailors at the 2016 Summer Olympics – 470